New Copper Penny was a nightclub located at the intersection of Southeast 92nd Avenue and Foster Road in Portland's Lents neighborhood, in the U.S. state of Oregon. As of December 2016, the building has now been demolished to make way for re-development into apartments.

See also
 List of defunct restaurants of the United States

References

External links
 

2016 disestablishments in Oregon
Defunct nightclubs in Portland, Oregon
Defunct restaurants in Portland, Oregon
Lents, Portland, Oregon